The dalasi is the currency of the Gambia that was adopted in 1971.  It is subdivided into 100 bututs. It replaced the Gambian pound at a rate of 1 pound = 5 dalasis, i.e. 1 dalasi = 0.2 pound = 4 shillings.

The derivative of dala is unknown. In numerous languages in the Francophonie, currency terms (including batut, dalasi, doromi, teemer) refer to the former 5 French West African franc note (the lowest denomination at the time), but to which the origins are not known. One speculated origin is a pronunciation of "dollar"; however, variants of dalasi in other Mandinka dialects (such as daasi) counter this speculation while butut is from Wolof butuut, "small thing".

As a result of inflation, now bututs coins have completely disappeared from circulation and the minimum monetary unit has become 1 dalasi.

Coins

See also; Coins of the Gambian dalasi

In 1971, coins in denominations of 1, 5, 10, 25 and 50 bututs and 1 dalasi were introduced. The 1 and 5 bututs were struck in bronze while the 10 bututs were brass and the 25, 50 bututs and 1 dalasi were cupro-nickel.  The reverse designs of the three higher denominations were taken from the corresponding denominations of the previous currency (1, 2 and 4 shillings), with the reverse designs for the lower three coins coming from the 6, 1 and 3 pence coins, respectively. All coins of this series depict former president, Sir Dawda Jawara.

Rounding methods for the butut were described in an article published in the 1986 issue of the recreational mathematical journal Eureka, in connection with Gambian mathematical education and its relation to counting coins; individual bututs were described as having no commercial significance, while other coins were colloquially referred to using old British nomenclature.

New 1 dalasi coins were introduced in 1987, modeled on the 50 pence coin of the United Kingdom. These replaced the larger, round dalasi coins which never saw its widespread use as the lower denominations.

In 1998, a new coin series was introduced, in which the effigy of Dawda Jawara was dropped and replaced with the national coat of arms on the obverses. However, older Jawara era coins still commonly circulate as legal tender. The 1 dalasi coin was also downsized in size and weight, but none of the other coins were changed. Only 25 and 50 bututs and 1 dalasi coins are currently in circulation, they are of the 1998 issue which also included 1, 5 and 10 bututs coins but have since disappeared due to their low value.

According to the situation for 2019, bututs coins have completely disappeared due to their low value, the minimum monetary unit has become 1 dalasi.

As of October 1, 2021, according to the Central Bank of the Gambia website ( https://www.cbg.gm/ ), the reference rate (value) of the dalasi was 48 per US dollar or about 2 cents US. All of their previous currency (notes and coins) is still legal to use. However the reduced value of the dalasi has made the 1b, 5b, and 10b coins of little use. The 25b (about half a cent) and 50b (about 1 cent) are of limited use as prices tend to be set in dalasi. The 1 dalasi coin is still in use to make change for the 5 dalasi (ten cents) banknote.

Banknotes

See also; Banknotes of the Gambian dalasi

Banknotes currently in circulation are 5, 10, 20, 25, 50, 100, and 200 dalasis. 1 dalasi notes were issued between 1971 and 1987. Current banknotes were first issued on 27 July 1996, then reprinted in 2001. On 27 July 2006, the Central Bank of the Gambia issued a new series of notes with images similar to the preceding issues, but with improvements in their designs, paper thickness, and security features. Most noticeably, the old white borders have been removed, giving the notes full printing of its main colors. Furthermore, the 5 and 10 Dalasis are coated with a special varnish to extend circulation life. Finally, the security features of the 100 Dalasis have been upgraded by the inclusion of a silver foil on the front of the note with the image of 100 embossed into the foil.

A polymer commemorative 20 Dalasis was put into circulation to commemorate 20 years of Progress and Self-Reliance under Yahya Jammeh's dictatorship.

On April 15, 2015, the Central Bank of the Gambia released a new family of banknotes that includes two new denominations, a 20 dalasis note to replace the 25 Dalasis note and a 200 dalasis note, twice the value of the previously highest denomination. All of the notes feature a portrait of the former President of the Gambia, Yahya Jammeh.

In February 2018, a new series of banknotes believed to be a reprinting of the 2006-13 issues, but with a new signature combination, will be released as an interim measure to replace notes with the portrait of former President of the Gambia Yahya Jammeh. The notes bearing his image will be removed from circulation.

A whole new series is being released during June 2019.

Commemorative banknotes

1 Dalasi (1978) - opening of the Central Bank of The Gambia's building in Banjul by President Sir Dawda Jawara.

20 Dalasis (2014) - 20 Years of Progress and Self-Reliance under the dictatorship of Yahya Jammeh.

See also
 Economy of the Gambia

References

External links
Central Bank of The Gambia

Currencies of Africa
Currencies of the Gambia
Currencies of the Commonwealth of Nations
Economy of the Gambia
Currencies introduced in 1971
1971 establishments in the Gambia